Mid Suffolk is a local government district in Suffolk, England.  Its council was based in Needham Market until late 2017, and is currently sharing offices with the Suffolk County Council in Ipswich. The largest town of Mid Suffolk is Stowmarket. The population of the district taken at the 2011 Census was 96,731.

The district was formed on 1 April 1974 by the merger of the Borough of Eye, Stowmarket Urban District, Gipping Rural District, Hartismere Rural District and Thedwastre Rural District.

Politics
Since the elections in  November 2019 the Council has comprised 
 Conservatives: 16 seats
 Green Party: 12 seats
 Liberal Democrats: 5 seats
 Independent: 1 seat

Parishes
The district has 123 parishes (3 are towns).

References

External links
Mid Suffolk District Council
Table of wards that comprise Mid Suffolk and the parishes that this 2001 law defines as constituting each of those wards

 
Non-metropolitan districts of Suffolk
1974 establishments in England